Mats Christéen (born 13 February 1982) is a Swedish former professional ice hockey defenceman.

Christéen was drafted 236th overall by the Nashville Predators in the 2000 NHL Entry Draft though he never played in the National Hockey League. He played 16 games in Elitserien for his hometown team Södertälje SK between 2001 and 2003. He finished his career in 2007 after spending three seasons with AIK IF.

After retiring, Christéen opened a furniture shop in Brooklyn, New York called Foundrywood. He has also worked as a model.

Career statistics

References

External links

1982 births
Living people
AIK IF players
Örebro HK players
Nashville Predators draft picks
Södertälje SK players
Swedish ice hockey defencemen
Tierps HK players
People from Södertälje
Sportspeople from Stockholm County